There are over 20,000 Grade II* listed buildings in England.  This page is a list of these buildings in North West Leicestershire.

North West Leicestershire

|}

Notes

External links

 North West Leicestershire
listed buildings
North West Leicestershire District